Anthony Charles Catania (born 1936) is an American researcher in behavior analysis known for his theoretical, experimental, and applied work. He is an Emeritus professor of psychology at the University of Maryland, Baltimore County (UMBC), where he taught and conducted research for 25 years prior to his retirement in 2008. He received a B.A. (1957) and M.A. (1958) at Columbia University in Psychology. He received his Ph.D. in Psychology at Harvard University in 1961. He remained at Harvard to conduct research as a postdoctoral researcher in B. F. Skinner's laboratory. Prior to his career at UMBC, he held a faculty position for nearly a decade at New York University (NYU).

He studies the behavior of both human and nonhuman animals. He has written over 200 journal articles and book chapters, has edited or co-edited six books, and has written two textbooks on learning Specific topics on which he has published include schedules of reinforcement, human verbal behavior, and the history of behavior analysis. He was the chief editor at the Journal of the Experimental Analysis of Behavior (1966–69) and served as an associate editor at several journals, including Behavioral and Brain Sciences, Behaviorism, and the European Journal of Behavior Analysis. He twice served as President of the Society of the Experimental Analysis of Behavior (from 1966 to 1967 and 1981–83) and as President of the Association for Behavior Analysis [now Association for Behavior Analysis International (ABAI), from 1981 to 1984]. He is a Fellow of Divisions 3, 6, 25, and 28 of the American Psychological Association (APA) and served as President of Division 25 from 1996 to 1998.

He resides in Columbia, Maryland.

References 

1936 births
Living people
Behaviourist psychologists
New York University faculty
Harvard University alumni
University of Maryland, Baltimore County faculty
Columbia College (New York) alumni
Academic journal editors
Scientists from New York City
20th-century American psychologists
21st-century American psychologists
Fellows of the American Psychological Association